DYLL (Pronounced as DY-double-L; 585 AM) Radyo Pilipinas is a radio station owned and operated by the Philippine Broadcasting Service. Its studio is located at TRB Bldg, Mapa St., Iloilo City, while its transmitter is located at Molo, Iloilo City.

References

Radio stations in Iloilo City
News and talk radio stations in the Philippines
Radio stations established in 1965
Philippine Broadcasting Service
People's Television Network